HFL may refer to:

Football leagues 
 Highland Football League, an association football league in Scotland
 Hills Football League, an Australian rules football league in South Australia
 Hokushin'etsu Football League, an association football league  in Japan
 Hume Football League, an Australian rules football in New South Wales, Australia

Other uses 
 Dutch guilder, the currency of the Netherlands until 2002
 The Haredi faction in the Likud, a political faction in Israel
 Hinduja Foundries, an Indian foundry
 Honeoye Falls-Lima Central School District, in Honeoye Falls, New York, United States
 Hydrofluoric acid
 Harvard Fatigue Laboratory